The Finger Touching Cell Phone was a concept cell-phone developed by Samsung and Sunman Kwon at Hong-ik University, South Korea.

Concept
The phone was designed to be worn as a wristband. The phone would project a 3 × 4 mobile-style keypad onto your fingers, with each joint making up a button. The product won an iF Concept Product Award in 2007.

References

External links
http://digital.no.msn.com/article.aspx?cp-documentid=2890839(Norwegian)
http://techdigest.tv/2007/02/turn_your_finge.html

Mobile phones
Pointing-device text input